John Rippon (29 April 1751 – 17 December 1836) was an English Baptist minister. In 1787 he published an important hymnal, A Selection of Hymns from the Best Authors, Intended to Be an Appendix to Dr. Watts’  Psalms and Hymns, commonly known as Rippon's Selection, which was very successful, and was reprinted 27 times in over 200,000 copies.  Many hymns originally published in Rippon's Selection are preserved in the Sacred Harp.

Life
At the age of 17, Rippon attended Bristol Baptist College in Bristol, England. After the death of John Gill, he assumed Gill's pastorate, the Baptist meeting-house in Carter Lane, Tooley Street,  Southwark, from 1773 at the age of 20 until his death, a period of 63 years. During these times, the church experienced great growth and became one of the largest congregations in the country. The congregation moved to New Park Street from Carter Lane in 1833. The  New Park Street Chapel could seat 1,200 people. Rippon's church was later pastored by Charles Haddon Spurgeon before moving to the Metropolitan Tabernacle at Elephant and Castle. 

Rippon also edited the Baptist Annual Register for 12 years. He was considered the foremost authority on the hymns of Isaac Watts. Rippon's Selection of hymns were used by the congregation until 1866 when Spurgeon produced an update called "Our Own Hymn Book" which borrowed much from Rippon and Watts. Like John Gill, he looked for a large scale conversion of the Jews at the end of the age.

At the time of his death, he was working on a book commemorating those buried in London's Dissenter cemetery, Bunhill Fields, where he himself was buried.

References

Bibliography
 Manley, Ken R. 'Redeeming Love Proclaim': John Rippon and the Baptists (Carlisle, Paternoster Press, 2004) (Studies in Baptist History and Thought - SBHT, 12).
 Manley, Ken R., "John Rippon and Baptist Hymnody," in Isabel Rivers and David L. Wykes (eds), Dissenting Praise: Religious Dissent and the hymn in England and Wales (Oxford, Oxford University Press, 2011), 95-123.

External links

Hymns from Rippon's Selection
John Rippon Biography at CyberHymnal.org
 
 
 

1751 births
1836 deaths
Burials at Bunhill Fields
18th-century hymnwriters
18th-century English Baptist ministers
English hymnwriters
Hymnal editors
British evangelicals